Abbas Samimi (born 9 June 1977, in Shahrekord) is a retired Iranian discus thrower.

His personal best throw is 64.98 metres, achieved in July 2004 in Manila. He is currently coaching his brothers, Mohammad and Mahmoud.

Achievements

References

1977 births
Living people
Iranian male discus throwers
Athletes (track and field) at the 2004 Summer Olympics
Athletes (track and field) at the 2008 Summer Olympics
Olympic athletes of Iran
Asian Games silver medalists for Iran
Asian Games medalists in athletics (track and field)
Athletes (track and field) at the 1998 Asian Games
Athletes (track and field) at the 2002 Asian Games
Athletes (track and field) at the 2006 Asian Games
Medalists at the 2002 Asian Games
Competitors at the 2005 Summer Universiade